Callao is a community in northern Snake Valley, along the border of Juab and Tooele counties, Utah, United States.

Description
The community was part of the original Pony Express overland route, and was first called Willow Springs in 1860. E. W. Tripp, his wife, and their son were the first to establish residence there, in 1870. In 1895 it was decided that Willow Springs was too common a name, and a new name would be chosen. The name Callao was chosen because of a resemblance to Callao, Peru, suggested by an old grizzled 1890s prospector in the region who was working out of Gold Hill to the north. It is unknown how the pronunciation changed from the Spanish .

Climate
According to the Köppen Climate Classification system, Callao has a semi-arid climate, abbreviated "BSk" on climate maps.

See also

References

External links

 NPR story

Unincorporated communities in Juab County, Utah
Unincorporated communities in Utah
Populated places established in 1870
Provo–Orem metropolitan area
1870 establishments in Utah Territory